"Y Si Te Digo" is the second single by Colombian recording artist Fanny Lu. It was written and produced by José Gaviria and Andrés Munera, for her debut album. The song was released digitally on November 6, 2007. It was later included on the compilation album Bachata Romántica: 1's (2009).

Track listing 
Y Si Te Digo (Album version)
 "Y Si Te Digo" - 

Y Si Te Digo - EP
 "Y Si Te Digo" - 
 "Y Si Te Digo (Radio Version)" - 
 "Y Si Te Digo (featuring. Eddy Herrera)" - 
 "No Te Pido Flores" - 

Bachata Romántica: 1's
 "Y Si Te Digo (featuring. Toby Love)" -

Charts

Weekly charts

Year-end charts

See also
List of number-one Billboard Hot Latin Songs of 2007

References

2007 singles
Spanish-language songs
Fanny Lu songs
Bachata songs
Toby Love songs
Universal Music Latino singles
2007 songs
Songs written by José Gaviria